Xavi Llorens Rodríguez (born 5 June 1958) is a Spanish football manager. He last was manager of FC Barcelona Femení. He joined the team in June 2006 and stepped down after the 2016–17 season, having spent eleven seasons at the club. Llorens is currently part of the Masia 360, a strategic project seeking to add cooperation between club's various departments.

Llorens was nominated for The Best FIFA Women's Coach in 2017.

Honours
Catalan Super Cup: 2009, 2010, 2011, 2013, 2014, 2015, 2016, 2016
Copa de la Reina: 2010–11, 2012–13, 2013–14, 2016–17
Women's Football Superleague: 2011–12, 2012–13, 2013–14, 2014–15

References

1958 births
Living people
Spanish football managers
FC Barcelona Femení managers
Primera División (women) managers